George Welch Olmsted (1874 – 1940) was an American businessman who founded the Long Island Lighting Company in 1911.  

He was also known for his philanthropic work, including for his leadership on the National Executive Board of the Boy Scouts of America.

Formative years
Born in Ridgway, Pennsylvania on May 18, 1874, George W. Olmsted was a son of Samuel Ashbel Olmsted and Frances (Welch) Olmsted. He was also related to landscape architect Frederick Law Olmsted, the designer of New York City's Central Park.

On June 17, 1904, Olmsted married Iva Catherine Groves.

Business career
In 1911, Olmsted founded the Long Island Lighting Company.

During late 1939 and early 1940, he was a member of the board of directors of the Queens Borough Gas and Electric Company.

Civic and public service activities
As an adult, Olmsted was active in the Boy Scouts of America. In 1926, he purchased and donated the land for the Chief Cornplanter Council camp, now known as Camp Olmsted. He was the chairman of the BSA National Camping Committee. In 1931, Olmsted received the Silver Buffalo Award for his service to youth.

Illness, death, funeral and interment
Olmsted suffered a heart attack on Friday evening, January 12, 1940, and died at his home in Ludlow, Pennsylvania on Monday, January 15, 1940 at 10 p.m. Following funeral services at his home at 2:30 p.m. on January 18, he was buried at the Oakland Cemetery in Warren, Pennsylvania.

He was survived by his wife and son, Robert G. Olmsted, who succeeded him in February 1940 as a member of the board of directors of the Long Island Lighting Company.

Notes

1874 births
1940 deaths
American businesspeople
People from Ridgway, Pennsylvania